On April 21, 1985, Eastern Airlines Flight 494 was operating a domestic flight from Hartsfield-Jackson Atlanta International Airport (ATL) to Piedmont Triad International Airport (GSO) with a McDonnell-Douglas DC-9. Shortly after takeoff, the flight experienced an uncommanded deployment of reverse thrust on the #2 engine. Flight 494 is one of the few recorded instances of an aircraft recovering safely from unintentional deployment of reverse thrust on one engine during flight.

Flight 
Shortly after takeoff from Hartsfield-Jackson Atlanta International Airport, Eastern Airlines Flight 494 experienced an unintended deployment of reverse thrust of the #2 engine. This caused the aircraft to quickly experience an uncontrolled roll to the right. Captain James Robertson and First Officer J.L. Bellmer shut down the #2 engine and were able to regain control of the aircraft while still in a turn, just a few knots before stalling. The crew was then able to return to Hartsfield-Jackson Atlanta International Airport by conducting a standard single-engine landing. At the time, there was no training provided or available for identifying or recovering from an unintentional deployment of reverse thrust.

Aircraft 
The aircraft involved was a McDonnell Douglas DC-9-31 manufactured with line number 274 in 1968 for Eastern Air Lines registered as N8948E, placing the aircraft at 17-years-old during the incident.

About two years after Eastern Airlines flight 494, on December 27, 1987, the aircraft was damaged beyond possibility of repair after experiencing a hard landing at Pensacola Regional Airport, Florida. The fuselage broke open just behind the wings causing the aircraft to stop with the tail section resting on the runway.

Investigation 
The engine reverse thrust systems are activated and deactivated hydraulically. The hydraulic system controlling the reverse thrust of engine #2 had failed, causing the clam-shell thrust reversers to catch the oncoming airflow, which was strong enough to pull the reverse thrust clam shells out. The safety mechanisms for preventing accidental deployment were also found to be defective.

An unintentional deployment of reverse thrust on one engine during a commercial flight typically results in complete loss of control due to the sudden opposing forces from the engines on each side. However, the crew was able to quickly identify the cause and quickly cut fuel to the engine, eliminating the reverse forces on one side. The aircraft landed safely with one engine operating. Captain James Robertson and First Officer J.L. Bellmer both received the Airline Pilots Association Superior Airmanship award for their efforts in saving the aircraft.

Events of Reverse Thrust Deployment in Flight 

 November 23, 1964, a Boeing 707-331 operating as Trans World Airlines Flight 800 experienced unexpected thrust reverser deployment during its take-off roll at Roma-Fiumicino Airport, Italy. The crew aborted take off where the aircraft began veering off the runway, struck a pavement roller, and ignited in flames killing 50.
 July 4, 1966, a McDonnell Douglas DC-8-52 conducting a training flight for Air New Zealand had the no. 4 engine thrust reverser deploy while simulating an engine failure on take off. Two of the five on board were killed.
 February 9, 1982, Japan Air Lines Flight 350 crashed just before landing at Haneda Airport after the captain of the flight intentionally deployed the thrust reversers. The captain was found to have paranoid schizophrenia, resulting in the captained being ruled not guilty by reason of insanity. Out of the 174 souls on board, 24 were killed.
 May 26, 1991, a Boeing 767-300 operating as Lauda Air Flight 004 also experienced an uncommanded reverse thrust deployment while cruising. This caused the aircraft to spin and stall, killing all 223 souls on board.

References 

Airliner accidents and incidents caused by mechanical failure
Accidents and incidents involving the McDonnell Douglas DC-9
Aviation accidents and incidents in 1985